Deniz Baykara (born 13 March 1984) is a Turkish professional footballer who plays for Greek club Panthrakikos.

Career
Baykara's career started in 1999, when he signed with Gaziosmanpaşaspor, an İstanbul team. He is a very gifted play-maker and surprises goaltenders with his deceptive shot. He is naturally left footed and can play as a midfielder.

Deniz Baykara was transferred to Superleague Greece club Skoda Xanthi in 2001, where he played for 7 seasons. In January 2008 transfer window, he was transferred to Football League club Panserraikos and helped the team gain promotion to Superleague Greece. In the summer of 2009, he signed a 2-year contract with Football League club Panetolikos. Since the summer of 2011, he plays for Panthrakikos. After 5 years he joined Trikala in July 2016.

On 19 September 2019, Baykara joined Nestos Chrysoupoli.

References

External links
 
 
Profile at epae.org

1984 births
Living people
People from Bitlis
Turkish footballers
Turkey youth international footballers
Xanthi F.C. players
Panserraikos F.C. players
Panetolikos F.C. players
Panthrakikos F.C. players
Trikala F.C. players
Doxa Drama F.C. players
Super League Greece players
Turkish expatriate footballers
Turkish expatriate sportspeople in Greece
Expatriate footballers in Greece
Association football midfielders